The Embassy of the State of Palestine in Malaysia is the diplomatic mission of the Palestine in Malaysia. It is located in Kuala Lumpur.

See also

List of diplomatic missions in Malaysia.
List of diplomatic missions of Palestine.

References

Diplomatic missions of the State of Palestine
Diplomatic missions in Kuala Lumpur